Sydney Arnold, 1st Baron Arnold (13 January 1878 – 3 August 1945) was a radical British Liberal Party politician who later joined the Labour Party and served as a government minister.

A son of W. A. Arnold, of Manchester, he was educated at Manchester Grammar School. As a member of the General Committee of the Manchester Liberal Federation, he served as Honorary Treasurer of the North-West Division of the Free Trade Union.

Politics
He unsuccessfully contested the Conservative seat of Holderness Division of the East Riding of Yorkshire at the December 1910 General Election. He was elected in 1912 as Member of Parliament for Holmfirth in what was then the West Riding of Yorkshire at a by-election following the resignation of the long-serving Liberal MP Henry Wilson.  

In 1914 he was appointed Parliamentary Private Secretary to Jack Pease, the President of the Board of Education. He was also appointed Parliamentary Private Secretary to Edwin Samuel Montagu the Financial Secretary to the Treasury. During the war he served as a captain in the South Staffordshire Regiment.

When his constituency was abolished for the 1918 general election, he was elected for the new Penistone constituency against a Coalition Government endorsed Unionist candidate. 
He supported a levy on capital and the nationalisation of the mines and railways. He resigned that seat due to ill-health in 1921.

Labour party

In 1922 he joined the Labour Party and was ennobled in 1924 as Baron Arnold, of Hale in the County of Chester, and served as Under-Secretary of State for the Colonies in Ramsay MacDonald's short-lived 1924 Labour Government, and as Paymaster-General from 1929 to 6 March 1931 in Macdonald's second government.

In the late 1930s he was a member of the Parliamentary Pacifist Group. He also served as a member of the council of the Anglo-German Fellowship. He resigned from the Labour Party, in 1938, on account of disagreement with its Foreign Policy.

Subsequently, his name was one of twenty-six attached to a letter printed in The Times supporting a policy of appeasement towards Germany. Because signatories included Barry Domvile and other leading members it was dubbed "The Link Letter" and its various signatories, including political moderates such as Arnold, William Harbutt Dawson, Smedley Crooke and Lord Londonderry, came under suspicion as far right supporters.

Arms

Notes

References

External links
 

1878 births
1945 deaths
Liberal Party (UK) MPs for English constituencies
UK MPs 1910–1918
UK MPs 1918–1922
UK MPs who were granted peerages
Labour Party (UK) hereditary peers
Barons in the Peerage of the United Kingdom
Politics of Penistone
United Kingdom Paymasters General
Barons created by George V